Henri "Henkka T. Blacksmith" Seppälä (Born 7 June 1980), is the former bassist of the Finnish metal band Children of Bodom from 1995 to 2019. He is also responsible for backing vocals both in studio and live. He is currently the bassist for the project called Moon Shot.

Henkka is a very common nickname for Henri and seppä means blacksmith in English. The reason he has a T. in the middle of his name is his nickname being Torso.

Biography
Seppälä was born in 1980 in Espoo, Finland. He first started playing guitar at the age of eleven. He got into the heavy metal scene through his brother, who listened to bands such as Slayer and Pantera with his friends. Before that, he had only had contact with glam metal/hard rock bands such as Guns N' Roses and Poison. As time passed, his interest started leaning towards heavier bands, until in the early 1990s he discovered black metal and death metal bands of the likes of Burzum, Dissection and Cannibal Corpse.

He played drums in his first band at the age of 13. The band was called Aivokasvain  (Brain Tumour). He was part of the band for two years, and then quit, switching his main instrument to the bass.

When Samuli Miettinen quit Inearthed (the original name of Children of Bodom) in 1996, Seppälä joined the band, (asked by lead guitarist and singer, Alexi Laiho) he then adopted the 5-string bass.

He is the frontman of the band when it comes to interviews and public appearances. Other than the fact that he can speak Russian, Finnish, English, Swedish and some Spanish and French, he is also the most equilibrated member of the band, in a general way.

He studies development studies and political history at the University of Helsinki when he has time, which is not too often. He is also into sports, and has a passion for (European) football. However, he also enjoys swimming. Musically, Seppälä was completely dedicated to Children of Bodom, and was the only member who did not have any side-projects. According to him, the most important things in his life are his family and his band at the time.

Influences
On the Children of Bodom official website, Seppälä lists his influences as Tom Araya, Billy Gould, Steve Brunner, Paulo Jr, Joe Principe and David Ellefson.

Equipment
 ESP Henkka T. Blacksmith Forest Signature Bass,4 string (34" neckthru body alder, EMG 35DC)
 ESP Henkka T. Blacksmith Bottom Line Signature Bass,5 string ( 34" neckthru body alder, EMG 40DC pickups)
 ESP Custom Shop "Assault" shaped (34" neckthru body alder, EMG 40DC pickups)
 ESP Custom Shop Viper Bass, same specs as his other basses, and can be seen on their live DVD Chaos Ridden Years (tuned CGCF)
 ESP Custom Shop Araya Shape (White with COBHC logo on fretboard, seen on the 2009 No Fear Tour)
Amp is an Ampeg SVT3pro and cabinet Ampeg 810.
He boost his sound with a Super Overdrive pedal or Tech21 Sansamp pre amp.
Audiotech Guitar Products Source Selector 1X6 Rack Mount Audio Switcher for switching between wireless units.

Notable Licks
"Black Widow" at 2:34.
"Bodom Beach Terror" at 2:47.
"Hate Me!" at 2:03.
"Downfall" at 1:36.
"Angels Don't Kill" at 4:04.

References

 "Fourteeng.net"

External links
Interview with Henkka
Interview with Henkka at NZRock.com

Finnish heavy metal bass guitarists
Children of Bodom members
People from Espoo
Living people
1980 births
21st-century bass guitarists